was a junior college in Chikusa-ku, Nagoya, Japan.

The college was founded in 1961. The predecessor of the school, Aichi Shukutoku Girls High School, was founded in 1905. The college closed in 2001.

Universities and colleges in Nagoya
Educational institutions established in 1961
Japanese junior colleges
Private universities and colleges in Japan
1961 establishments in Japan